Steven Hutchinson (born 17 January 1968) is a German basketball coach and former player. Since 2018, he has served as assistant coach for BV Chemnitz 99 of the German ProA league.

As an active player, he played several seasons for the Telekom Baskets Bonn of the German Basketball League.

His last team as an active player was EWE Baskets Oldenburg of the German Basketball Bundesliga.

Throughout his career, he had been selected to the BBL All-Star Game on two occasions.

Personal
Born in Berlin as the child of an American father and a German mother, Hutchinson spent most of his childhood in Würzburg.

References

External links
 German Bundesliga Profile
 Eurobasket.com Profile

Living people
1968 births
German people of American descent
German men's basketball players
Basketball players from Berlin
Centers (basketball)
Portland Pilots men's basketball players
S.Oliver Würzburg players
Telekom Baskets Bonn players
Bayer Giants Leverkusen players
EWE Baskets Oldenburg players